Antoine Marius Simon Ponchin (29 October 1872, Marseille - 15 December 1933, Paris) was a French Impressionist landscape painter.

Biography 
His father, Joseph Marius Ponchin (1846-1891) was also a painter. From 1893 until his death, he was a regular exhibitor at the Salon. He received honorable mention there in 1904 and a third-class medal in 1906, the same year he was awarded the Prix de Raigecourt-Goyon for landscape painting. In 1910, he received a second-class medal.

He was accompanied by his son, Joseph Henri (1897-1981), who was also a painter. Together, they decorated the new Lycée Albert-Sarraut.

The mission was a great success and he was nominated for the Legion of Honor by Albert Sarraut himself, who was then the Colonial Minister. That same year, he was named a Knight in the Legion.

His works may be seen at the Musée des Beaux-Arts de Chambéry, Musée des Beaux-Arts de Nîmes, the Musée des Beaux-Arts de Rouen and the Huntsville Museum of Art.

References

Further reading
 André Alauzen and Laurent Noet, Dictionnaire des peintres et sculpteurs de Provence-Alpes-Côte d'Azur, Jeanne Laffitte, 2006

External links 

19th-century French painters
French male painters
20th-century French painters
20th-century French male artists
1872 births
1934 deaths
Artists from Marseille
19th-century French male artists